Manchester stabbing may refer to:

 2018 Manchester Victoria stabbing attack
 2020 Manchester stabbing